The TalTech Sports Hall is a multi-purpose indoor arena complex in Mustamäe, Tallinn. It was opened in 1975 and renovated in 2001. It is the current home arena of the  TalTech Basketball team.

References

External links
 Official website 

Sports venues in Estonia
Basketball venues in Estonia
Indoor arenas in Estonia
Sports venues in Tallinn
Volleyball venues in Estonia
Badminton venues